Caroline Sageman (born 29 August 1973) is a French classical pianist.

Biography 

Sageman was an precocious child: she took her first piano lessons at the age of 6 with Denyse Rivière, Marcel Ciampi's assistant and Jean-Marc Luisada teacher. At 9, with the Orchestre Philharmonique de Radio France, she performed the piano concerto in D major by Haydn at the Salle Pleyel. She entered the Conservatoire de Paris at the age of 13 in the class of Germaine Mounier. She was only seventeen when she won the 6th prize of the XII International Chopin Piano Competition in Warsaw, making her the youngest winner of this competition since its inception. Among her major professional meetings, are those of Claudio Arrau, Miłosz Magin, Hubert Guillard, Merces De Silva Telles, Nikita Magaloff, Yevgeny Malinin and Eugen Indjic. She then performed abroad, notably in Japan, Italy and Switzerland, and in France. She has worked with, among others, conductors Pierre Dervaux and Jean-François Paillard. She also performs in chamber ensembles, in particular with Faustine Tremblay (violin), Bertrand Braillard (cello), Jean Ferrandis (flute), Dominique de Williencourt (cello), and David Galoustov (violin).

A specialist of Chopin and Liszt, she imagined in 2010 the musical show Chopin, Musset, les doubles romantiques with singer Patrick Bruel. The reading of excerpts from Alfred de Musset's  and The Nights alternates with pieces by Frédéric Chopin that she performs.

She also approaches the contemporary repertoire and has created works by Arnaud Petit, Françoise Choveaux and Bruno Giner, who dedicated to her his play Après une lecture de...

In parallel to her concert activities, Caroline Sageman is the assistant to Jean-Marc Luisada at the École normale de musique de Paris Alfred Cortot and teaches at the Conservatory of Blanc-Mesnil (93).

Prizes 
 1982: First Prize of the "Royaume de la Musique"
 1990: 6th prize at the XII International Chopin Piano Competition

Discography 
 Franz Liszt (Lyrinx, 2004)
Sonata in B minor (dedicated to Robert Schumann) 
Obermann Valley (First year of pilgrimage: Switzerland) 
Rêve d’amour No 3 of the Liebesträume
Saint-François de Paule marchant sur les flots (Legends, No 2)
 Frédéric Chopin (Lyrinx, 2002)
Sonata in B flat minor, Op. 35 
 Scherzos 
 No 1 in B minor, Op. 20 
 No 2 in B flat minor, Op. 31 
 No 3 in C sharp minor, Op. 39 
 No 4 in E major, Op. 54
Pianists: Caroline Sageman and Lidija Bizjak (Lyrinx, 2008)
 Frédéric Chopin (Lyrinx, 2011)
 Polonaise-Fantaisie 
 Andante spianato
 Grande Polonaise
 Ludwig van Beethoven (Lyrinx, 2012)
Complete Sonatas for violin and piano, with David Galoustov.

References

External links 
 Caroline Sageman on Radio Classique
 Caroline Sageman – Mazurka in F sharp minor, Op. 59 No. 3 (1990) (YouTube)

1973 births
Living people
Musicians from Paris
Conservatoire de Paris alumni
21st-century French women classical pianists
Prize-winners of the International Chopin Piano Competition